Jonas Folger (born 13 August 1993) is a German professional motorcycle racer who most recently competed in the 2021 Superbike World Championship. He is best known for his stint in MotoGP with Monster Yamaha Tech 3 getting a podium in Germany behind Marc Marquez and ahead of Dani Pedrosa. His subsequent career has been affected by illness, having been diagnosed with Gilbert's syndrome. Folger is also a race winner in both Moto 3 and Moto 2 World Championships.

Career

125cc World Championship

In the 2009 125 World Championship Jonas Folger took his first podium and was Rookie of the Year.

Red Bull Ajo Motorsport
In 2011 he moved to Aki Ajo's team taking his first win and two more

Moto3 World Championship

IodaRacing Project (2012)

Mapfre Aspar Team Moto3 (2012–2013)

Moto2 World Championship

AGR Team (2014–2015)

2014

2015

Dynavolt Intact GP (2016)

2016

MotoGP World Championship

Monster Yamaha Tech 3 (2017)

2017

Return to Moto2

Petronas Sprinta Racing (2019)

2019

Career statistics

Grand Prix motorcycle racing

By season

By class

Races by year
(key) (Races in bold indicate pole position, races in italics indicate fastest lap)

References

External links

1993 births
Living people
German motorcycle racers
125cc World Championship riders
Moto3 World Championship riders
Moto2 World Championship riders
Tech3 MotoGP riders
MotoGP World Championship riders
Superbike World Championship riders
People from Mühldorf
Sportspeople from Upper Bavaria